The 1914–15 season was the 26th season in existence for Sheffield United, during which they played in Division One.  At this time the club did not employ a manager, with the team being selected by the Football Committee although the club secretary, John Nicholson, undertook many of the duties now associated with a team manager.   The club continued to establish itself as one of the top sides in the country, finishing sixth in the First Division and beating Chelsea 3–0 in the final to become winners of the FA Cup.

Season overview
After a solid end to the previous season there was an amount of optimism for what the club could achieve in the coming term.  Reserve players Bob Barnshaw, Bert Pearson and Sam Bagnall were allowed to leave during the close season but it was thought that only a few good additions to the squad would turn the side into genuine contenders for the league title.

The football committee duly signed Harry Pantling and Jack Thompson but it was the signing of Wally Masterman for £800 from Gainsborough Trinity that proved their most astute purchase.

The season was played under the shadow of war from the European continent and attendances dwindled as the country moved onto a war footing.  The team's pre-season optimism was dealt a massive blow in their first game when star player Billy Gillespie broke his leg and did not feature again that term.  This loss unsettled the team and they made a miserable start, winning only three games up until the start of December.

The loss of Gillespie had an unforeseen effect however, as it allowed other players to come into their own.  Joe Kitchen was the main goal threat but David Davis and particularly Masterman began to score regularly.

The change in fortune came in December from when the team embarked on an impressive run of form, losing only once more until the start of April.  During this time the club also had another successful run in the FA Cup.  Beaten semi-finalists the season before, this time round they reached the final at Old Trafford where they beat Chelsea 3–0 to lift the cup for the third time.

Unfortunately the hoped for challenge for the championship never really materialised. Ironically the team's success in the cup would begin to have a detrimental effect on their league form as the resulting fixture pile up meant that they were required to play nine competitive games during April 1915, including the FA Cup Final, and results suffered accordingly.  This, coupled with their poor start, saw the side eventually finish sixth in the table in what turned out to be the final season before the league and cup competitions were abandoned whilst the country was at war.

Players

Squad

Squad statistics

|}

Transfers

In

Out

League table

Matches

League

FA Cup

Friendlies

References

Sheffield United
Sheffield United F.C. seasons